Herman Vermeulen (born 10 November 1954) is a former Belgian football player and currently assistant manager at Waasland-Beveren.

References

1954 births
Living people
Belgian footballers
Belgian football managers
K.V. Oostende managers
Oud-Heverlee Leuven managers
People from Temse
Association footballers not categorized by position
Footballers from East Flanders